Mezhdurechensky Urban Okrug is a municipal formation (an urban okrug) in Kemerovo Oblast, Russia, one of the sixteen urban okrugs in the oblast. Its territory consists of the territories of two administrative divisions of Kemerovo Oblast—Mezhdurechensky District and Mezhdurechensk City Under Oblast Jurisdiction.

The urban okrug was established by the Law of Kemerovo Oblast #104-OZ of December 14, 2004.

Geography
Verkhny Zub peak, the highest point of the oblast, is located in the eastern border of the district.

References

Notes

Sources

External links
Official website of Mezhdurechensky Urban Okrug 

Urban okrugs of Russia

